The leader of the Opposition in Prince Edward Island is a title traditionally held by the leader of the largest party not in government in the Legislative Assembly of Prince Edward Island.

This list is incomplete

Politics of Prince Edward Island
Prince Edward Island
Prince Edward Island politics-related lists